Bicheno may refer to:

 Bicheno, Tasmania, a town in Australia
 Bicheno's finch (Taeniopygia bichenovii), a bird indigenous to Australia
 Hugh Bicheno, a British-American military historian
 James Ebenezer Bicheno, a British Colonial Secretary for Van Diemen's Land 1843–1851.
 James Bicheno Francis, a British-American engineer